Hamilton Kemp Wright (2 August 1867  9 January 1917) was an American physician and pathologist who served as the United States Opium Commissioner.

Biography

Early life
Hamilton Wright was born in Cleveland, Ohio, on August 2, 1867. He graduated with a degree in medicine (MD CM) from McGill University in Montreal, in 1895. He served at a McGill-affiliated hospital in Montreal for one year, then spent two years in China and Japan, studying scientific, social, and economic conditions. In 1897, he received the British Medical Association Studentship for research on the nervous system. In 1900–1903, he served upon a special mission in India, studying tropical diseases. In 1900 he was appointed as the first director of the Pathological Institute located in Kuala Lumpur in the Federated Malay States (now the Institute for Medical Research). He returned to the United States in 1903.

Career
He made his name by supposedly finding a pathogen that "caused" beri-beri (before it was discovered to be a vitamin deficiency). He authored many articles and monographs on the nervous system, as well as on the social and economic problems in the tropics. 

He was appointed by U.S. President Theodore Roosevelt as United States Opium Commissioner on July 1, 1908. In February 1909, he served as U.S. delegate to the International Opium Commission in Shanghai, China. He served at the follow-on conference at The Hague in 1911.

William Howard Taft saw that the U.S. could capitalize on the Chinese market if it would join forces with them in combating their opium problem. The problem was, the U.S. didn't have its own house in order. As a result, Wright became the first of many U.S. anti-drug crusaders. "Of all the nations of the world, the United States consumes most habit-forming drugs per capita," Wright said in 1911, calling opium "the most pernicious drug known to humanity."

His wife, Elizabeth Wright, was an assessor to the League of Nations Opium Advisory Committee in the 1920s, although the British Foreign Office called her "incompetent, prejudiced, ignorant, and so constituted temperamentally as to afford a ready means of mischief-making."

References

1867 births
1917 deaths
Drug policy of the United States

American physicians
Opium
William Howard Taft